Edwin Graffan Earle (April 28, 1927 – March 26, 2009) was an American professional basketball player. A power forward, Earle attended Loyola University of Chicago, where he scored 1,018 points in 119 games. He was Loyola's second 1,000-point scorer, following Jack Kerris. During his junior season, he contributed 9.4 points per game and helped the Ramblers to a 25-6 overall record and a runner-up finish at the National Invitation Tournament. As a senior in 1949–1950, he averaged 10.0 points per game. He was later inducted into the school's hall of fame. 

In July 1950, he signed with the Sheboygan Redskins of the National Professional Basketball League. He was waived on October 31, 1950. In 1952–1953, he played for the Elmira Colonels in the American Basketball League, averaging 12.6 pints in 28 games. In August 1953, Earle signed with the Syracuse Nationals of the National Basketball Association (NBA) where he went on to appear in two games during the 1953–54 season. In 1954, he joined the Wilkes-Barre Barons in the Eastern Professional Basketball League where he averaged 11.6 points in 8 games. Earle also played on teams of former college players in exhibition games against the Harlem Globetrotters.

Earle also distinguished himself in 16-inch softball, and is a member of the Chicago 16 Inch Softball Hall of Fame. He spent 26 years with the Yellow Freight Corporation.

References

External links
 

1927 births
2009 deaths
American men's basketball players
Basketball players from Chicago
Carl Schurz High School alumni
Loyola Ramblers men's basketball players
Power forwards (basketball)
Syracuse Nationals players
Undrafted National Basketball Association players